A qalam is a type of pen made from a dried reed, used for Islamic calligraphy.

Qualam may also refer to:

 Al-Qalam, a sura of the Qur'an
 Qalam, Iran, a village in Iran

See also
 Kalam (disambiguation)